the 19th edition of the Kuwait Federation Cup tournament but without Al-Sulaibikhat SC due to the club withdrew from it.

Kuwait SC enter as defending champions.

Group A

Final Standings:

Group B

Final Standings:

Semi-finals

1st legs

2nd legs

Final

See also
2015-16 in Kuwaiti football

Kuwait Federation Cup
Kuwait Federation Cup
Federation Cup